Lansing Engine Plant was a General Motors automotive engine plant located in Delta Township, Michigan. Constructed in 1981, it was originally constructed to create diesel counterparts of GM's gasoline engines, though, by the next year, GM had abandoned the project.  By 1987, the plant was producing the Quad-4 engine, and in 2002 the EcoTec engine, but was closed that same year.

GM sold the plant to Ashley Capital in 2005 who then leased it out to auto parts supplier Ryder Logistics.

Products 
 GM Diesel Engine: 1981-1982
 Quad-4 Engine: 1987-2002
 EcoTec Engine: 2002

References

General Motors factories
Economy of Lansing, Michigan
Motor vehicle assembly plants in Michigan
Buildings and structures completed in 1981
2002 disestablishments in Michigan
1981 establishments in Michigan